D. R. Brown may refer to:

 Daniel Russell Brown (1848–1919), American politician
 D. R. Brown (American football), American football coach